Thicker than Water is an American sitcom that aired on ABC from June 13, 1973, to August 8, 1973. The series is based on the UK sitcom Nearest and Dearest.

Synopsis
Julie Harris and Richard Long starred as a brother and sister who run "Paine's Pure Pickles," a pickle factory, in order to claim a $75,000 inheritance from their father Jonas.

Cast
 Richard Long as Ernie Paine
 Julie Harris as Nellie Paine

Episode list

External links

1973 American television series debuts
1973 American television series endings
1970s American sitcoms
American television series based on British television series
American Broadcasting Company original programming
Television series about siblings
Television shows set in New Jersey